Mauritian Sign Language (MSL) is the indigenous deaf sign language of Mauritius.

References

Bibliography
Adone, Dany & Gebert, A. (2006). A dictionary and grammar for Mauritian Sign Language. Volume 1. Editions Le Printemps Ltée, Vacoas, République de Maurice.

Sign language isolates
Languages of Mauritius